Kirchsee may refer to:

 Kirchsee (Bavaria), a lake in the south German state of Bavaria.
 Kirchsee (Schleswig-Holstein), a lake in the north German state of Schleswig-Holstein.